Iksal (Iksal; , Kislot Tavor) is an Arab local council in northern Israel, about  southeast of Nazareth. It has an area of 9,000 dunams and a population of  primarily Muslim inhabitants.

Name
The name of town is believed to derive from that of Chesulloth (Chisloth-Tabor), a biblical town mentioned in the Book of Joshua.

History

Iksal was known to Josephus as Xaloth. Archaeological excavations in Iksal revealed artifacts from the period of Roman and Byzantine rule in Palestine. A ring decorated with the image of a lion was found and dates to one of these time periods. In burial caves carved into the rock, sarcophagi and ossuaries containing pottery, glass vessels, and jewelry were found. Also dated to the Byzantine period are agricultural installations, carved into the rock and plastered, inside of which were found part of a winepress.

Middle Ages 
In 536 a Council was held in Jerusalem to condemn Severus of Antioch and his followers. Present at that Council were 45 bishops from Palestine, including one Parthenius, bishop of Exalus, which is identified with Iksal. Thus we know the town had enough Christians in the 6th Century to warrant a bishop.

Remains have been excavated dating to the Umayyad period (7th century CE), including pottery and Cream Ware bowls.

On December 22, 946, the forces of the Egyptian Ikhshidid dynasty defeated those of Sayf al-Daula at Iksal. The latter retreated to Aleppo, while the Ikshidid forces advanced onto Damascus.

During the period of Crusader or Mamluk rule in Palestine, a castle was built in Iksal, the ruins of which remain visible today. The Crusaders probably added to a much older structure which had been constructed first in the Abbasid, and then in the Fatimid era. A large cemetery by the village was named Mukbarat el Afranj ("Cemetery of the Franks").

Yaqut al-Hamawi described the place (which he called Aksal), as "A village in the Jordan Province, lying 5 leagues from Tiberias towards Ar Ramlah. The river Abu Futrus is in the neighbourhood."

Building remains from the Mamluk period have also been excavated. One excavation revealed three constructions with pottery remains, all dating from the Mamluk era, 14th and 15th century CE.

Ottoman Empire 
In 1517, the village was included in the Ottoman empire with the rest of Palestine, and in the 1596 tax-records it appeared as Ksal, located in the Nahiya of Tabariyya of the Safad Sanjak. The population was 17 households and 1 bachelor, all Muslim. They paid a tax rate of 25% on agricultural products, which included wheat, barley, summer crops, fruit trees, occasional revenues, goats and beehives; a total of 6,633 Akçe.

In 1738 Richard Pococke passed by the place, which he called Zal. He noted that near it was "many sepulchres cut in the rock, some of them are like stone coffins above-ground, others are cut into the rock, like graves, some of them have stone covers over them, so that formerly this might be no inconsiderable place." A map from Napoleon's invasion of 1799 by Pierre Jacotin showed the place, named as Iksad.

Edward Robinson, who passed by the village in 1838, repeated Pocockes assertion that Iksal had many sepulchres.
 
In 1863 Henry Baker Tristram saw the remains of a "Crusader" tower in Iksal, while in 1875, Victor Guérin  found it to have 400 inhabitants, all Muslim. In 1881, the PEF's Survey of Western Palestine (SWP) described Iksal as "a large stone village, built in the plains, with a conspicuous square tower, surrounded by gardens and containing about 400 Moslims, many caves and cisterns."

A population list from about 1887 showed that Iksal had about 600 Muslim inhabitants.

British Mandate
At the time of the 1922 census of Palestine Iksal had a population of 621  Muslims, increasing slightly in the 1931 census to 752, still all Muslims, in a total of 166 houses.

In the 1945 statistics the population was 1,110, all Muslims, while the total land area was 16,009 dunams, according to an official land and population survey. Of this, 581 were allocated for plantations and irrigable land, 13,029 for cereals, while 47 dunams were classified as built-up (urban) areas.

Israel
Like many other Arab towns and villages in the Galilee that were left standing after the 1948 Arab-Israeli War, Iksal surrendered to Israeli forces without putting up a fight. Individuals who had collaborated with Zionist officials prior to Israel's establishment, negotiated the terms of surrender and transition to rule under the new military government.

Demographics
According to the Israel Central Bureau of Statistics, the town had a low ranking (3 out of 10) on the country's socioeconomic index (December 2001). Only 65.3% of students are entitled to a matriculation certificate after Grade 12 (2000). The average salary that year was NIS 3,640 per month, whereas the national average was NIS 6,835. Its population has grown at an annual rate of 2.8%. In Iksal, about 60 percent of the inhabitants are family relations of one another.

Archaeology
In 2008 and 2012, archaeological surveys were conducted at the ancient site by Daniel Zohar and Mouqary `Abdallah on behalf of the Israel Antiquities Authority (IAA).

Notable people
 Ayid Habshi, footballer
 Sameh Zoabi, film director

See also
 Arab localities in Israel

References

Bibliography

External links
Welcome To Iksal
Survey of Western Palestine, Map 6:  IAA, Wikimedia commons

Arab localities in Israel
Local councils in Northern District (Israel)
Ancient Jewish settlements of Galilee